Nikolai Golovatenko (born 27 February 1963) is a Soviet former racing cyclist. He rode in the 1990 Tour de France.

References

External links

1963 births
Living people
Soviet male cyclists
People from Kostanay